Pulling Teeth is the fourth full-length studio album by the hardcore punk band Straight Faced. It was released in 2000 on Epitaph Records. The album was produced by Blag Dahlia of Dwarves. The track "Happy" appeared on Epitaph Records' Punk-O-Rama Vol. 5.

Critical reception
Exclaim! wrote: "Their sound has a heaviness that sticks out among their sunny-sided SoCal brethren. This is the sort of thing that would come out of New York, sounding like Helmet meets Sick Of It All." The San Diego Union-Tribune called the album "nothing more than a lame attempt to rip off Rage Against the Machine."

Track listing

Personnel
Straight Faced
 Johnny Miller – vocals
 David Tonic – guitar
 Jeff Hibben – bass
 Ron Moeller – drums
Production
 Recorded at Grandmaster Recorders, Hollywood, California, USA
 Produced by Blag Dahlia & Bradley Cook
 Recorded by Bradley Cook
 Mixed by Blag Dahlia & Bradley Cook at Bay7, North Hollywood, California
 Mastered by Gene Grimaldi at Oasis Mastering, Burbank, California

References

External links
Epitaph Records album page

Epitaph Records albums
2000 albums
Straight Faced albums